Jamie Hamilton may refer to:

Jamie Hamilton (publisher) (1900–1988), British book publisher, rower and Olympic medalist
Jamie Hamilton (motorcyclist) (born 1991), Northern Irish motorcycle racer
 Jamie Lee Hamilton (1955–2019), Canadian politician
Jamie Hamilton, a character in the television series Galactica 1980
Jamie Hamilton (rugby union) (born 1970), English rugby union player
Jamie Hamilton (footballer) (born 2002), Scottish footballer

See also
James Hamilton (disambiguation)